The Gepiș is a right tributary of the river Crișul Repede in Romania. It discharges into the Crișul Repede in Groși.

References

 Plan Urbanistic General-ORASUL ALESD - Primaria Alesd 

Rivers of Romania
Rivers of Bihor County